VA-125 was an Attack Squadron of the U.S. Navy. It was established as Reserve Attack Squadron VA-55E, most likely during the activation of the Naval Air Reserve in 1946. It remained in an inactive status until January 1950, when it was redesignated VA-923. The squadron was called to active duty on 20 July 1950. It was redesignated VA-125 on 4 February 1953, and disestablished on 10 April 1958. Its nickname was the Rough Raiders from 1952 onward.

A second, unrelated, squadron was designated VA-125 in 1956.

Significant events
1 February 1953: The squadron’s commanding officer, Commander J. C. Micheel, was killed in action in Korea.

Home port assignments
The squadron was assigned to these home ports, effective on the dates shown:
 NAS St. Louis – Assigned prior to 1950. Exact date unknown.
 NAS San Diego – 02 Aug 1950
 NAS Miramar – Jan 1952

Aircraft assignment
The squadron first received the following aircraft on the dates shown:
 TBM Avenger – Prior to 1950. Exact date unknown.
 AM Mauler – 1950
 AD-2 Skyraider – Sep 1950
 AD-4Q Skyraider – Oct 1950
 AD-4 Skyraider – Dec 1950
 AD-3 Skyraider – Dec 1950
 AD-4B Skyraider – Jun 1953
 AD-4NA Skyraider – Sep 1953
 AD-6 Skyraider – Oct 1954
 AD-7 Skyraider – Jan 1957

See also
 List of squadrons in the Dictionary of American Naval Aviation Squadrons
 Second VA-125 (U.S. Navy)
 Attack aircraft
 List of inactive United States Navy aircraft squadrons
 History of the United States Navy

References

External links

Attack squadrons of the United States Navy
Wikipedia articles incorporating text from the Dictionary of American Naval Aviation Squadrons